Goreswar railway station is a railway station on Rangiya–Murkongselek section under Rangiya railway division of Northeast Frontier Railway zone. This railway station is situated beside Baihata-Goreswar Road at Goreswar in Baksa district in the Indian state of Assam.

References

Railway stations in Baksa district
Rangiya railway division